Ugly is the second album released by American alternative metal band Life of Agony. The band incorporates a more melodic and less heavy alternative metal sound compared to the heavier, New York hardcore-influenced sound heard on their 1993 debut, River Runs Red. Ugly still features the band's trademark heavy riffing (e.g. 'I Regret', 'Damned If I Do', 'Fears'); however, elements such as "gang" backing vocals and double-bass drumming have been replaced by slower, more melodic moments (e.g. "Let's Pretend") and even acoustic guitar (e.g. bonus tracks "Coffee Break" and bonus Bob Marley and the Wailers cover track, "Redemption Song"). Lead singer, Keith Caputo, opted for a more natural vocal delivery, eschewing the baritone howls heard on the previous record.

The majority of Ugly was written by and even performed by the band during the extensive touring in support of their debut album. 

Known for his work with Guns N' Roses and Metallica, producer Steve Thompson was brought in to work on the album, which was recorded at Systems Two in Brooklyn, NY. Thompson also mixed Ugly with longtime partner Michael Barbiero.  

Ugly was released by Roadrunner Records in 1995. That same year, Roadrunner Records issued a limited, European edition of the album in a custom, tin metal case. This edition featured exclusive artwork and two bonus tracks recorded during the Ugly recording sessions. Alternate mixes/versions of these bonus tracks were later released on the 1989-1999 compilation album. However the versions found on the European limited edition of Ugly, are the original Steve Thompson and Michael Barbiero mixes and are exclusive to the metal box release.

Original drummer, Sal Abruscato, left the band after the album's tour in 1996, due to, "creative differences", but later rejoined for LOA's first, River Runs Again reunion in 2003. Abruscato would ultimately leave the band for the final time in 2018.

While many fans consider River Runs Red to be Life Of Agony's definitive work, some consider Ugly to be one of the most overlooked alternative metal albums of the '90s, with some critics describing the album as, "near flawless".

Reception
Stephen Thomas Erlewine of Allmusic praised the album writing in his review "For listeners unaccustomed to blistering, noisy metal, Life of Agony will be agonizing. However, fans of the genre will find the band to be among the best of the mid-'90s, capable of spitting out razor-sharp riffs. What makes Ugly work is the band's grasp of sonic texture -- they can make even their quiet moments menacing." Critically, the album performed well, but did not repeat the sales of River Runs Red; this can most likely be attributed to the album's considerable change in sound.

Track listing

Personnel
Life of Agony
Keith Caputo - vocals 
Sal Abruscato - drums & co.
Alan Robert - bass guitar
Joey Z. - lead & rhythm guitar
Additional musicians
Ed Terry - Keyboard and Synthesizer (on "Unstable")
Technical personnel
Steve Thompson - production
Steve Thompson and Michael Barbiero - mixing 
Mike Marciano, Eddie Reed and Jay Ryan - engineering
George Marino - mastering

References

1995 albums
Life of Agony albums
Roadrunner Records albums